was a Japanese diplomat and businessman.

Diplomatic career
Inoue served as Minister Plenipotentiary to Belgium in 1898. In 1898-1906, he served as Minister Plenipotentiary in Berlin.

He was Japan's ambassador in Germany (1906-1908), in Chile (1910–1913) and in the United Kingdom in 1913-1916.

Inoue was a director of the Manchurian Railway.

See also
 List of Japanese ministers, envoys and ambassadors to Germany

References

Ambassadors of Japan to the United Kingdom
1861 births
1929 deaths
Ambassadors of Japan to Germany